"Mariana in the South" is an early poem by Alfred Tennyson, first printed in 1833 and significantly revised in 1842.

Textual history 

This poem had been written as early as 1831, and Hallam Tennyson tells us that it "came to my father as he was travelling between Narbonne and Perpignan". The characteristic features of Southern France are vividly depicted. The poem was very greatly altered when re-published in 1842, that text being practically the final one, there being no important variants afterwards.

In the edition of 1833 the poem opened with the following stanza, which was afterwards excised and the stanza of the present text substituted:

See also 
 Mariana (poem)
 Measure for Measure

References

Bibliography 

 Collins, John Churton, ed. (1900). The Early Poems of Alfred, Lord Tennyson. London: Methuen & Co. pp. 50–53. 
 McLuhan, H. M., ed. "Mariana in the South". RPO: Representative Poetry Online. University of Toronto Libraries. Retrieved 12 May 2022.
 Tennyson, Hallam (1897). Alfred Lord Tennyson: A Memoir by his Son. Vol. 1. London: Macmillan and Co., Limited. pp. 117, 500–504.

Poetry by Alfred, Lord Tennyson
1833 poems
1842 poems